Alidaunia S.r.L. is an Italian airline based in Foggia.  It operates scheduled passenger services, air ambulance, air taxi/charter, offshore, aircraft maintenance, flying school and aerial work services. Its main base is Gino Lisa Airport, Foggia.

History 
Alidaunia was established in March 1976 and in 1978 was licensed for film and photographic work. In 1984 it received a license for public transport. With government support in 1985 it started scheduled services from Foggia to the Tremiti Islands. In 1992 and 1993 it operated on the Foggia to Milan (Malpensa) route and from 1993 to 1995 on the Foggia to Parma route using a Mitsubishi MU 300 aircraft on both routes.

The airline is owned by Roberto Pucillo (general Manager) (55%), Roberto Manzo Rocco (20%), Paulo Giangrossi (15%), Michele Perricone (5%).

Destinations 
Alidaunia operates the following services using helicopters (as at September 2020):

 Foggia - Gino Lisa Airport
 Isole Tremiti - San Domino Island Heliport
 Peschici - Peschici Heliport
 Vieste - Vieste Heliport

Fleet 
The Alidaunia fleet consisted of the following aircraft (at July 2015):

4 Agusta A109
1 Sikorsky S-76A
1 Eurocopter BK 117 C1
2 AgustaWestland AW139
1 Robinson R22

Incidents and accidents 
 On November 5, 2022, an Alidaunia helicopter flying between Tremiti and Foggia crashed, killing 7, including a Slovenian couple and their 13 year old daughter.

References

External links 
 Official website

Airlines of Italy
Airlines established in 1976
Italian companies established in 1976